The Ford Lake Dam (originally known as the Rawsonville Dam and sometimes referred to as the Hydro Dam) is an earthen, multi-arch hydroelectric gravity dam and powerhouse crossing the Huron River in Ypsilanti Charter Township in Washtenaw County in the U.S. state of Michigan.

The dam and powerhouse were commissioned by Henry Ford in order to supply electricity to the nearby Ypsilanti Ford Motor Plant.  In 1969, the dam and surrounding land area were given to the city of Ypsilanti and surrounding township.  The township took full ownership in 1990 and maintains control of the facility.  The dam has a maximum spillway capacity of 28,000 cubic feet per second (793 m³/s).  The south embankment of the dam contains an emergency fuse plug spillway. The area surrounding the dam's output is organized into two parks operated by the township. The North Hydro Park is part of the Border-to-Border Trail.  Along with the adjacent, undeveloped South Hydro Park, the area is popular for shore fishermen and canoeing/kayaking along the Huron River to Belleville Lake.

References

Dams in Michigan
Hydroelectric power plants in Michigan
Huron River (Michigan)
Dams completed in 1932
Energy infrastructure completed in 1932
1932 establishments in Michigan
Buildings and structures in Washtenaw County, Michigan